Bally Sports Sun is an American regional sports network owned by Diamond Sports Group, a joint venture between Sinclair Broadcast Group and Entertainment Studios, and operates as an affiliate of Bally Sports. The channel broadcasts local coverage of professional, collegiate and sporting events in the state of Florida, with a focus on professional sports teams based in Miami, Tampa and Orlando. Bally Sports Sun and sister regional sports network Bally Sports Florida are headquartered in Fort Lauderdale, Florida with studios located in Tampa.

Bally Sports Sun is available on cable providers throughout Florida; it is also available nationwide on satellite via DirecTV.

History

The channel launched on March 4, 1988, as Sunshine Network, originally serving as an affiliate of Prime Network. The network was formed as a joint-venture of 11 cable companies and Home Sports Entertainment. Later that year, Sunshine would obtain rights to broadcast the Orlando Magic in their inaugural season. In 1992, the network would also secure right to another new team, the Tampa Bay Lightning. In its early years, the network also aired some public affairs programming in addition to sports.

Because Florida did not have a Major League Baseball team at the time, the network featured games from multiple teams including Rangers, Astros, Tigers, Orioles, and Twins, along with college sports from UCF, Florida State, Stetson and Jacksonville Universities. In 1993, Sunshine gained rights to the Florida Marlins expansion team. In 1997, half of the 70 game schedule was moved to rival SportsChannel Florida (which at the time was owned by Marlins' owner Wayne Huizenga). The following season, the entire schedule was moved to SportsChannel.

In 1996, News Corporation, which formed a sports division for the Fox Broadcasting Company in 1994 with the acquisition of the television rights to the National Football Conference of the National Football League, entered into a joint venture with TCI spinoff Liberty Media and rebranded that company's Prime Network affiliates under the "Fox Sports Net" banner. Sunshine Network was the only Fox Sports Net owned-and-operated charter outlet that did not rebrand under that name when it and the other Prime outlets relaunched as Fox Sports Net on November 1, 1996. Liberty Media (which at this point owned 49% of the network) proposed Fox Sports Sunshine as a new name for the network, but ultimately the rest of the owners did not approve it. In early 2000, Fox Sports Net programming moved from Sunshine to the newly rebranded Fox Sports Net Florida.

Sunshine Network changed its name to Sun Sports on January 18, 2005, in order to reflect its sports-focused programming. Sun Sports and Fox Sports Florida were spun off with the rest of the Fox Sports Networks and most of News Corporation's other U.S. entertainment properties into 21st Century Fox in July 2013.  On October 4, 2015, Sun Sports changed its name to Fox Sports Sun (FSSUN).

On December 14, 2017, as part of a merger between both companies, The Walt Disney Company announced plans to acquire all 22 regional Fox Sports Networks from 21st Century Fox, including Fox Sports Sun and sister network Fox Sports Florida. However, on June 27, 2018, the Justice Department ordered their divestment under antitrust grounds, citing Disney's ownership of ESPN. On May 3, 2019, Sinclair Broadcast Group and Entertainment Studios (through their joint venture, Diamond Holdings) bought Fox Sports Networks from The Walt Disney Company for $10.6 billion. The deal closed on August 22, 2019. On November 17, 2020, Sinclair announced an agreement with casino operator Bally's Corporation to serve as a new naming rights partner for the FSN channels. Sinclair announced the new Bally Sports branding for the channels on January 27, 2021.  On March 31, 2021, coinciding with the 2021 Major League Baseball season, Fox Sports Sun and sister network Fox Sports Florida were rebranded as Bally Sports Sun and Bally Sports Florida, resulting in 18 other Regional Sports Networks renamed Bally Sports in their respective regions. The first live sports event on Bally Sports Sun was at 7 PM featuring the Miami Heat at the Indiana Pacers. The game was preceded with the "Heat Live" pregame show.

On March 14, 2023, Diamond Sports filed for Chapter 11 Bankruptcy.

Programming

Bally Sports Sun holds the regional cable television rights to the NBA's Miami Heat, the NHL's Tampa Bay Lightning, and the Tampa Bay Rays of Major League Baseball. In addition, Bally Sports Sun offers basketball, football, baseball and other sanctioned sporting events from Florida State University. Bally Sports Sun has long maintained a partnership with the University of Florida and Florida State, producing all regular season football game telecasts for both universities and airing them statewide on the channel on a day-behind basis. However, with the launch of the SEC Network, University of Florida programming now consists of GatorZone and coaches shows.

Bally Sports Sun maintains separate feeds for individual regions of the state, with feeds for Miami (covering South Florida), Tampa (covering western Florida) and Orlando (covering northern and central Florida). The separation of broadcast zones for the channel is mostly due to the defined broadcast territories set by the National Basketball Association for the Orlando Magic and Miami Heat, and by the National Hockey League for the Tampa Bay Lightning. Programming seen in each broadcasting zone is common in most areas, and includes a mix of programs supplied by Bally Sports and some original programming exclusive to Bally Sports Sun and Bally Sports Florida.

Bally Sports Sun is also home to outdoor programming, highlighted by extensive salt and fresh water fishing programs such as the Chevy Florida Insider Fishing Report and Sportsman's Adventures.

Programming rights with Bally Sports Florida 
Bally Sports Sun shares the broadcast rights to the aforementioned professional sports teams with Bally Sports Florida. As the two regional networks are commonly owned, events from any team/conference in which Bally Sports Sun and Bally Sports Florida broadcasts are able to air on either channel depending on the start time of each team's respective games (particularly with the Marlins and Rays, since both teams routinely play at concurring start times).

The two channels do not focus on one region of Florida (although it was long rumored since the two came under common ownership that Bally Sports Sun would carry only teams from the Orlando and Tampa Bay areas, while Bally Sports Florida would carry Miami-area teams), but simply distribute games in accordance with each team's territorial rights, with both cable channels maintaining joint exclusivity over regional broadcasts of Lightning, Heat, Marlins, Rays and the Magic, while Bally Sports Florida maintains exclusive regional rights to NHL games involving the Miami-based Florida Panthers.

In 2010, the Miami Marlins moved all of their Major League Baseball games to Bally Sports Florida, while the Tampa Bay Rays began carrying all their games on Bally Sports Sun. Prior to 2009, some Rays games were available on broadcast television stations in the state via a network made up of the state's Ion Television stations.

Current personalities

Tampa Bay Rays 
 Dewayne Staats – play-by-play announcer
 Brian Anderson – color commentator
 Matt Joyce – pre-game and post-game color analyst
 Denard Span – pre-game and post-game color analyst
 Doug Waechter – pre-game and post-game color analyst
 Rich Hollenberg -  Pre and Post game host and fill-in play-by-play announcer
 Kevin Burkhardt - fill-in play-by-play announcer (also a play-by-play announcer for MLB on Fox and NFL on Fox, and a studio host for MLB on Fox)
 Tricia Whitaker - field reporter

Tampa Bay Lightning 
 Dave Randorf– play-by-play announcer
 Brian Engblom – analyst
 Paul Kennedy – host and in-game reporter
 Bobby Taylor – pre, post-game and intermission analyst
 Dave Andreychuk – pre, post-game and intermission analyst

Florida Panthers 
 Steve Goldstein – play-by-play announcer
 Randy Moller – analyst

Miami Marlins 
 Paul Severino – play-by-play announcer
 Tommy Hutton - analyst 
 Craig Minervini – pre-game host and in-game reporter and Fill-in play-by-play announcer
 J. P. Arencibia – pre and post-game analyst
 Kelly Saco – pre-game host and Fill-in in-game reporter

Miami Heat 
 Eric Reid – play-by-play announcer
 John Crotty – analyst
 Jason Jackson – post-game host and in-game reporter
 Ron Rothstein – half-time and post-game analyst

Orlando Magic 
 David Steele – play-by-play announcer
 Jeff Turner – analyst
 Paul Kennedy – host and in-game reporter
 Dante Marchitelli – fill in in-game reporter

References

External links

Sports television networks in the United States
Sports in Florida
Fox Sports Networks
Television channels and stations established in 1988
Companies that filed for Chapter 11 bankruptcy in 2023
Prime Sports
1988 establishments in Florida
Bally Sports